Melica rectiflora is a species of grass in the family Poaceae. It is native to Greece and Crete.

Description
The leaf-sheaths are tubular and are closed on one end with its surface being glabrous. Eciliated membrane have a ligule which is truncate. The main panicle branches are indistinct, scaberulous and are racemose.

Besides the pedicels, the spikelets have 1 fertile floret which is diminished at the apex. Both the upper and lower glumes are keelless, membranous, oblong and are purple coloured.

Its palea have thick keels and is elliptic and 2-veined. Flowers are fleshy, oblong and truncate with 2 lodicules. The fruits have caryopsis with additional pericarp and have linear hilum.

References

rectiflora
Flora of Crete
Flora of Greece
Taxa named by Pierre Edmond Boissier
Taxa named by Theodor von Heldreich